Bolivaroscelis is a genus of praying mantis in the family Amorphoscelidae.

Species
The following species are recognised in the genus Bolivaroscelis:
 Bolivaroscelis bolivarii (Giglio-Tos, 1913)
 Bolivaroscelis carinata (Bolivar, 1908)
 Bolivaroscelis werneri Roy, 1962

See also
List of mantis genera and species

References

 
Amorphoscelidae
Mantodea genera